Damir Pekič (born 15 January 1979) is a former Slovenian football player who played as a forward

Club career
Pekič started his senior career in Maribor. Before he was given a real chance in the club he was sent to Celje on loan for a season. There he was the best scorer of the 2000–01 Slovenian PrvaLiga season as he scored 23 goals in 29 games.

References

External links

1979 births
Living people
Sportspeople from Maribor
Slovenian footballers
Association football forwards
NK Železničar Maribor players
Slovenian PrvaLiga players
Slovenian Second League players
NK Maribor players
NK Celje players
Slovenian expatriate footballers
Rot Weiss Ahlen players
Expatriate footballers in Germany
Expatriate footballers in Portugal
Expatriate footballers in Hungary
Expatriate footballers in Austria
Slovenian expatriate sportspeople in Germany
Slovenian expatriate sportspeople in Portugal
Slovenian expatriate sportspeople in Hungary
Slovenian expatriate sportspeople in Austria
C.S. Marítimo players
Nemzeti Bajnokság I players
Zalaegerszegi TE players
NK Nafta Lendava players
NK Domžale players
Slovenia youth international footballers
Slovenia under-21 international footballers